This is a list of governors of the Agra Presidency. The provisional establishment of the Governor of Agra happened in 1833 until the Agra Presidency was renamed as North-Western Provinces in 1836.

Governors of Agra (1834–1836)
In 1833 an act of Parliament was passed to constitute a new presidency (province), with its capital at Agra.

See also 
 (1732 – 1857) - Nawabs of Awadh
 (1834 – 1836) - Governors of Agra
 (1836 – 1877) - Lieutenant Governors of the North-Western Provinces
 (1856 – 1877) - Chief Commissioners of Oudh
 (1877 – 1902) - Lieutenant Governors of the North-Western Provinces and Chief Commissioners of Oudh
 (1902 – 1921) - Lieutenant Governors of the United Provinces of Agra and Oudh
 (1921 – 1937) - Governors of the United Provinces of British India
 (1937 – 1950) - Governors of the United Provinces
 (1950 – cont.) - Governors of Uttar Pradesh

References 

 Provinces of British India
 The India List and India Office List By India Office, Great Britain

British administration in Uttar Pradesh
Governors